The 2017–18 season was the 61st season in RK Zamet’s history. It is their 10th successive season in the Dukat Premier League, and 40th successive top tier season.

Team

Current squad

Goalkeeper
 12  Fran Lučin
 16  Marin Sorić
 26  Wang Quan

Wingers
RW
 5  Martin Mozetić
 6   Jakov Mozetić
LW
 2  Damir Vučko
 3  Dario Jeličić
 20  Dujam Dunato

Line players
 13  Veron Načinović
 19  Ivan Majić

Back players
LB
 7  Luka Grgurević 
 24  Zhao Chen

CB 
 8  Patrik Martinović
 9  Nikola Njegovan
 17  Antun Dunato
 22  Marko Mrakovčić
 23  Matija Golik (captain)

RB
 11  Marin Kružić
 15  Matija Starčević

Technical staff
  President: Vedran Devčić
  Sports director: Vedran Babić
  Head Coach: Drago Žiljak
  Assistant Coach: Marin Mišković
  Goalkeeper Coach: Valter Matošević
  Fitness Coach: Emil Baltić
  Fizioterapist: Dragan Marijanović
  Team Manager: Boris Konjuh

Competitions

Overall

Last updated: 2 June 2018

Dukat Premier League

League table

Updated to match(es) played on 18 March 2018. Source: Premijer liga Reultati.com

Matches

Source: Premijer liga SportCom.hr

Relegation play-offs table

League table

Updated to match(es) played on 2 June 2018. This table contains statistics combined with the regular part of the Dukat Premier League with matches played by team in the relegation play-offs. Source:  SportCom.hr

Matches

Croatian Cup

PGŽ Cup - Qualifier matches

Matches

Friendly matches

60th Anniversary  matches

Pre-season  matches

Mid-season  friendlies

Premier League statistics

Shooting

Updated to match(es) played on 2 June 2018. Source: Premier league Rukometstat.com

Goalkeepers

Updated to match(es) played on 2 June 2018. Source: Premier league Rukometstat.com

Top goalscorers

Updated to match(es) played on 2 June 2018. Source: Premier league Rukometstat.com

7m

Updated to match(es) played on 2 June 2018. Source: Premier league Rukometstat.com

Assists

Updated to match(es) played on 2 June 2018. Source: Premier league Rukometstat.com

Punishment drawn

Updated to match(es) played on 2 June 2018. Source: Premier league Rukometstat.com

2m punishments

Updated to match(es) played on 2 June 2018. Source: Premier league Rukometstat.com

Yellow cards

Updated to match(es) played on 2 June 2018. Source: Premier league Rukometstat.com

Croatian Cup statistics

Updated to match(es) played on 7 February 2018. Source: Hrvatski Kup SportCom.hr

Transfers

In

Out

Source: Hrsport.net

Sources
Hrs.hr
Rk-zamet.hr
SportCom.hr
Sport.net.hr
Rezultati.com

References

RK Zamet seasons